Kiya Johnson (born February 27, 2002) is an American artistic gymnast. She currently competes for the LSU Tigers gymnastics team.

Early life 
Johnson was born on February 27, 2002, in Dallas, Texas, to Carl and Kyesha Johnson. She grew up in Coppell, Texas, where she attended Coppell High School, graduating a year early in 2019.

Level 10/elite career 
Johnson trained at Texas Dreams Gymnastics under coaches Kim Zmeskal Burdette and Chris Burdette. She was the junior Nastia Liukin Cup all-around, vault, and beam champion in 2015; she earned 2nd place on the vault and 5th place in the all-around at the Junior Olympic National Championships that same year.

In 2016, Johnson briefly trained as a junior elite gymnast; she earned a berth to the Secret U.S. Classic, placing 17th in the all-around and tying for 7th place on floor exercise.

Johnson returned to level 10 competition for the 2018 season. She placed 5th in the all-around at the Nastia Liukin Cup. She tied for first place in the all-around and won the floor exercise title at the J.O. National Championships.

In 2019, Johnson earned the bronze medal in the all-around at the Nastia Liukin Cup, and successfully defended her J.O. National Championship all-around and floor exercise titles, adding another title on the balance beam.

College career

2020 
Johnson began competing for the LSU Tigers gymnastics team in the 2020 season. She competed all-around in 9 of 11 meets. On January 24, she earned her first career perfect 10 on the balance beam at Florida, and on February 14 added a perfect 10 on the vault at the GymQuarters invitational. She also posted season-high scores of 9.95 on the uneven bars, 9.975 on the floor exercise, and 39.75 in the all-around. She was named SEC Freshman of the Week for four consecutive weeks beginning in January, and also earned the SEC Gymnast of the Week honor following an all-around win against Auburn on January 17.

At the conclusion of the (prematurely terminated) season, Johnson was named the SEC Freshman of the Year. She also earned first team All-America honors on vault, floor exercise, and the all-around.

Career perfect 10.0

References 

Living people
2002 births
LSU Tigers women's gymnasts
American female artistic gymnasts
Sportspeople from Dallas
People from Coppell, Texas
NCAA gymnasts who have scored a perfect 10